Puerto Rico Highway 144 (PR-144) is a rural road that travels from Jayuya, Puerto Rico to Ciales. This road extends from PR-140 in Collores and ends at PR-149 in Toro Negro.

Major intersections

Related route

Puerto Rico Highway 5144 (PR-5144) is a bypass road that branches off from PR-144 and ends at PR-141 east of downtown Jayuya.

See also

 List of highways numbered 144

References

External links

 PR-144, Municipio de Jayuya, Puerto Rico

144